Charles Foster Kane is a fictional character who is the subject of Orson Welles' 1941 film Citizen Kane.  Welles played Kane (receiving an Academy Award nomination), with Buddy Swan playing Kane as a child. Welles also produced, co-wrote and directed the film, winning an Oscar for writing the film.

Inspiration
The general consensus is that publishing tycoon William Randolph Hearst is the primary inspiration behind Charles Foster Kane.

In the film, Kane is given the line "You provide the prose poems; I'll provide the war," undeniably similar to "You furnish the pictures, and I'll furnish the war," a quote widely attributed to Hearst. Also, an overhead shot of Hearst's ranch is shown in the film as Xanadu, the lavish estate where Kane resides.

In addition, Kane's unsuccessful attempt to make his second wife an opera star parallels Hearst's effort to make his mistress Marion Davies a serious dramatic movie actress despite critics' complaints that she was miscast and better in light comedy roles. The connection with Hearst is strengthened by the fact that Welles's co-writer, Herman J. Mankiewicz, was a frequent guest of Davies at Hearst Castle.

Some biographies of Welles posit that Welles himself was a source of inspiration for the character. Some of the character's dialogue on how to run a newspaper are direct quotes from Welles's comments on how to make a motion picture (though this was his first). Mankiewicz included dialogue about Kane's voracious appetite, also a reference to Welles.

In recent years, Kane has been compared unfavorably to contemporary media figures such as Sumner Murray Redstone, Rupert Murdoch, Ted Turner and Elon Musk.

Fictional character biography
Citizen Kane explores the life of the titular character. We are given an overview of his public career in the pastiche News on the March newsreel, with some parts then shown in more detail through the flashback recollections of those who knew him.

Early years 
Kane is born of humble origins in the fictional settlement of Little Salem, Colorado, in 
1862 or 1863. A supposedly worthless mine given to his mother in 1868—to settle a bill for room and board by Fred Graves — is discovered to be rich in gold, making the family suddenly fabulously wealthy. In 1871, in return for an annual income of $50,000, Kane's mother puts her son and the money under the guardianship of New York City banker Walter Parks Thatcher, who raises Kane in luxury. Kane resents Thatcher for ripping him away from his family, and spends most of his early adult life rebelling against him. He attends prestigious colleges such as Harvard, Yale, Princeton, Cornell and a college in Switzerland—and gets himself expelled from all of them.

At the age of 25 Kane acquires control of the money, the world's sixth-largest private fortune. He returns from a trip abroad to take control of the New York Daily Inquirer, a struggling newspaper acquired on his behalf by Thatcher as a result of a foreclosure on a debt, thinking that "it would be fun to run a newspaper". He takes up full-time residence in the newspaper office (the sitting editor resigning in protest) and in the first edition publishes a "declaration of principles" stating his duty to be truthful to his readers and to campaign on behalf of the poor and underprivileged. His best friend Jedediah Leland - the Inquirers drama critic - asks to keep the text of the declaration, feeling it might one day be an important document.

To Thatcher's fury, Kane campaigns against slum landlords, "copper robbers" and "traction trusts" (monopoly control of railways) - including companies in which he himself is a major shareholder. To finance the fledgling Inquirer, Kane uses his personal resources, reasoning that this would allow him to operate it, even at a million-dollar annual loss, for 60 years. Over a period of six years, Kane also hires staff members away from the rival Chronicle newspaper, regarding them as collectibles. However, he uses yellow journalism tactics to blow stories out of proportion and encourage a war with Spain in 1898.

Political career 
Kane, whose party affiliation is never explicitly specified, is shown to be a supporter of Theodore Roosevelt, joining him on a whistle stop train tour. "One President at least" owes his election to the support of Kane's newspapers.

Kane eventually marries Emily Monroe Norton, the niece of a President of the United States. Their marriage takes place at the White House. The marriage sours because of Kane's egomania, obsession with his newspapers and attacks on her uncle's administration. Their marital problems reach the point that they are barely on speaking terms, with Kane ignoring Emily as she reads the rival Chronicle newspaper at breakfast.

Kane opposes US entry into World War I.

As his popularity increases, Kane, who regards himself and is widely seen as a future President, runs as a "fighting liberal" for Governor of New York in 1916, against corrupt boss James "Jim" W. Gettys. He addresses a packed rally at Madison Square Gardens, promising to have Gettys arrested and sent to prison. An election victory is almost certain until Gettys reveals evidence of Kane's affair with a young singer named Susan Alexander. Gettys blackmails Kane, meeting with him and his wife at Susan's apartment, but Kane refuses to drop out of the race despite Gettys' leverage. The scandal goes public and Kane loses the election decisively.

The night of Kane's loss, a drunk and disillusioned Leland asks him for a transfer to the Chicago paper. He accuses Kane of treating "the working man" he claims to fight for as a possession, and says that, for all his talk of helping the less fortunate, the only person Kane really cares about is himself. Kane allows him to transfer to Chicago, effectively ending their friendship.

Emily divorces Kane shortly afterward, and dies two years later, along with their son, in a car accident.

Later life 
Two weeks after his first divorce, Kane marries Susan in a small ceremony at the City Hall in Trenton, New Jersey. He forces her into a doomed and humiliating career as an opera singer, building an opera house in Chicago specially for her. Leland, now a drama critic for the Chicago Inquirer, refuses to toe the company line by praising Alexander's performances. Leland becomes too drunk at the difficult task of writing a truthful review against Kane's wishes, and falls into a stupor. Kane visits the paper's newsroom and finishes the review with Leland's negative tone intact, intending to prove that he still has integrity; he then fires Leland. In retaliation, Leland refuses his severance package and mails back the torn-up check with the original copy of Kane's "declaration of principles", which Kane angrily destroys.

After Susan attempts suicide, Kane releases her from her disastrous operatic career and spends most of his time at Xanadu, his gigantic Gothic chateau, full of objets d'art which he has acquired over the decades, and built on an artificial mountain on his vast estate in Florida. By 1925 Kane is being denounced as a "communist" by the aged Thatcher to a congressional committee, and in the same month as an enemy of the working man and a "fascist" by a speaker at a public rally in Union Square, Manhattan. He insists that he is simply "an American". The business downturns of the Great Depression—as well as Kane's excessive spending habits on the crumbling and unfinished Xanadu—forces him to downsize his media empire. He is also forced to hand over financial management of his businesses, although not operational control of his newspapers, to the aged Thatcher. Susan is unable to stand the monotonous routine inside the cavernous mansion and Kane's increasingly domineering nature, and eventually leaves him.

Kane continues to travel and meet with world leaders. He returns from an aeroplane trip to Europe in 1935, declaring that he has met with the leaders of "England, France, Germany and Italy" and that "there will be no war". He initially supports Adolf Hitler, with whom he appears on a balcony, but later denounces him. He also meets with but denounces Francisco Franco.

Death 
Kane eventually becomes a recluse at Xanadu, living alone and estranged from all his friends and no longer wielding much influence over politics. Most of his giant estate is now overgrown, with most of the animals gone from its zoos. He dies alone in his bedroom one night in 1941, after uttering his last word, "Rosebud."

The death of the "Great Yellow Journalist" is a national news event and is the lead story in many newspapers.  His own Inquirer chain devotes the entire front page to him, praising him for his "lifetime of service" and stating that the "entire nation mourns". The rival Chronicle is less complimentary, recalling his "stormy career" and stating that "few … will mourn" him. The Chicago Globe also mentions his "stormy career" and denounces him as "US Fascist No 1"; the last two papers run unflattering photographs of him. The Minneapolis Record Herald praises him as the "Sponsor of Democracy", the Detroit Star as "Leader of [the] News World" and a "Man of Destiny", but the El Paso Journal accuses him of having "Instigated War for Profit". His death is also covered in the French, Japanese and Russian press.

Reporter Jerry Thompson is assigned to find out what "Rosebud" means. Despite interviewing all of Kane's living acquaintances, he never finds out what it is. After the reporters depart, his staff start burning in an incinerator those of his possessions which they see as trash. The viewer sees that the word "Rosebud" was written on the sled Kane's parents gave him as a young boy, and left behind at his mother's boarding house when he was sent away to live with Thatcher. It is implied earlier in the film that Kane found the sled in a warehouse, where he had been looking over his late mother's possessions, around the time he first met Susan.

Relationships

Susan Alexander

Susan Alexander Kane (Dorothy Comingore) was Kane's second wife. She was twenty-one when they first met in the mid-1910s (Kane would have been at least fifty); she is evidently low class and is in charge of the sheet music at a shop. Kane was attracted to her because she liked him for himself, despite not knowing he was a public figure. Kane sets her up in a larger and more comfortable apartment with an African American maid, which Gettys describes as a "Love nest" to implicate her as Kane's mistress; the film does not make it clear whether or not she really was. However, a mere two weeks after his first wife divorced him in 1916, Kane married Susan.

Susan was an aspiring opera singer when she and Kane first met, but is not particularly talented. Despite this, Kane tried to force her into a career as an opera singer, even building an opera house specifically for her, in which she performs the leading role in a fictional opera Salammbo. Her weak voice and poor acting attract the derision of the audience and of the stage hands. Kane's Xanadu estate was built at least in part to please her. Susan is the last of Kane's friends to leave him as well as the original owner of the snow globe he drops after saying "rosebud". As of 1941, she is still living, but is an alcoholic. Despite having "lost all her money" she is running a run-down nightclub ("El Rancho") in Atlantic City, which is where she is interviewed by Jerry Thompson.

Jedediah Leland

Jedediah Leland (Joseph Cotten) was a close friend of Kane, having met him in college. According to Mr. Bernstein, he came from a wealthy family that lost all their money. He is generally acknowledged to represent the morality and idealism Kane himself loses as the film progresses. During Kane's campaign for Governor, he is seen addressing a small audience in the street shortly before Kane's speech. In disgust at Kane's throwing away of the election, he moves to Chicago to work as drama critic for the Inquirer in that city; by the time he writes his bad review of Susan Alexander's operatic debut, he and Kane have not spoken in a number of years. In 1941 Jedediah lives in a nursing home in Manhattan, where Jerry Thompson interviews him.

Walter Thatcher

Walter Parks Thatcher (George Coulouris) is a New York banker. He becomes Kane's legal guardian in 1871. Kane resents him and, when he comes into control of his fortune in the late 1880s, uses the Inquirer to harass him. Thatcher, clearly getting on in years by the 1890s, initially regards Kane as mentally "still the college boy" and urges him to greater financial prudence. In a scene in the newsreel in 1925, Thatcher, described as the "grand old man of Wall Street", tells a congressional investigation that Kane is a Communist. Thatcher is still alive, presumably at least in his nineties, after the Crash of 1929, and takes control of Kane's failing business empire, although allowing Kane to retain "a considerable measure of control" over his newspapers and reassuring Kane that the Depression is merely temporary and that he might yet die richer than him. When Thatcher asks Kane what he would have liked to have been, Kane replies "Everything you hate". He is dead by 1941, his unpublished memoirs kept in a vault.

Mr. Bernstein

Mr. Bernstein (Everett Sloane) is a business executive and by 1941 is Chairman of the Board of Directors of Kane's business interests. Having served as Kane's personal assistant since at least when he took over the Inquirer, Bernstein proved the most loyal to the man. He is on good enough terms to visit and leave a present for Kane's infant son, to Mrs Kane's irritation. Bernstein willingly participated in indulging Kane's obsession in his wife's operatic career even though it was ill-considered by everyone else. However, he has scruples such as advising his employer not to make promises he cannot keep in his Declaration of Principles.

Wealth and empire
Apart from the New York Inquirer, Kane publishes similar Inquirer newspapers in Chicago, Detroit, Philadelphia, San Francisco, and other major American cities. The News on the March newsreel at the beginning of the film also states that Kane controls two newspaper syndicates and a radio network; it also mentions that Kane has other business interests in real estate, logging, shipping, and food retailing. However, Kane's empire largely collapses at the onset of the Great Depression, and he is forced to hand financial control of his remaining holdings (although not operational control of his newspapers) to Thatcher. Kane has enough wealth to build Chicago's opera house, as well as his unfinished mansion, Xanadu.

The mansion contains Kane's vast collection of classical sculptures and art, and the newsreel states that portions of Xanadu were taken from other famous palaces overseas.

Notes

References

 Little Salem, Colorado. Welles, Orson, director. Citizen Kane: 75th Anniversary. Warner Brothers, 2016. DVD. Timestamp: 01:48:16 "One stove from the estate of Mary Kane, Little Salem, Colorado. Value: $2."

Fictional business executives
Fictional newspaper publishers (people)
Fictional mass media owners
Fictional characters from Colorado
Fictional characters based on real people
Film characters introduced in 1941
Citizen Kane
Drama film characters
Fictional politicians
Male characters in film